Çalkaya can refer to:

 Çalkaya, Maden
 Çalkaya, Taşova